CR2 is an Irish-owned banking software company which provides mobile, internet and ATM financial service technology to more than 100 retail banks across Africa, the Middle East and Asia. Headquartered in Dublin, Ireland, the company has offices in Dubai, London, Cairo, Amman, Bengaluru, Lagos, Johannesburg, Singapore and Perth. Its customers include ANZ, Barclays, Standard Chartered, Botswana Savings Bank, Jordanian Bank al Etihad, pan-African bank Orabank, and Nigeria’s Access Bank plc and Diamond Bank.

History 
Founded in 1997 by two former Kindle Banking Systems directors, and part of the fintech portfolio of Ireland's state economic development agency Enterprise Ireland, CR2 is an Irish software company that provides banking products and services to financial institutions in emerging markets.

By 2000, after a series of venture capital cash injections and investment from directors, and the acquisition of London-based Interlink for £10m  and was valued at more than $27m.

With investors backing CR2 to the value of €34.5 million since its foundation in 1997, the company emerged from the Dot-com bubble crash of late 2000/early 2001, to report an increase in revenue by posting a turnover of €16.4m in 2002.

An additional R&D funding round to the value of €10m was completed in 2005.

By 2012, the company was placed on the market with a value of more than €60m.

BankWorld 
CR2 is best known for its digital banking platform, BankWorld. 
It features mobile and internet technology for retail and corporate customers; integrated ATM technology with switch, card management, production, monitoring, screen design, support tools as well as POS (or point of sale) acquiring and payment systems; SMS push and pull and USSD; with APIs that enable third-party channel integration and innovation.

Awards and recognition 
 Ovum Ltd, the independent, analyst and consultancy firm, recommends CR2's digital product offering in its published report of August 2016.
 CR2 recognised for delivering ‘Excellence in Channel Banking Software Solutions’ at the New Age Banking Awards, 2018

References

Software companies of Ireland
Financial software companies
Software companies established in 1997
Banking software companies
Companies of the Republic of Ireland
1997 establishments in Ireland